Thorpe is a Nottinghamshire village or hamlet lying to the east of East Stoke about a mile off the A46 Fosse Way, and situated in the countryside southwest of Newark.

Historical
About  of common land was enclosed 40 years ago, and exonerated from tithes, but all the rest still remains titheable. Sir Robert Howe Bromley, Bart., is principal owner, and lord of the manor...W.R. Brockton Esq. is a small owner, and Mr John Tomlin is a resident owner, with a few other small owners."
The Roman fort known as AD PONTEM is located east of the FOSSE WAY Roman road north east of the village.

Saint Laurence's Church Thorpe
The abolitionist Lucy Townsend lived here at the rectory from 1836. See St. Lawrence's Church, Thorpe.

Historical
"The church exhibits portions in the several styles of English architecture; the tower was formerly surmounted with a steeple. A fine tessellated pavement, some coins, and other Roman relics, have been discovered. On a small mound in a field adjoining the turnpike-road Henry VII is said to have erected his standard, on 6 June 1487, the day upon which he fought the battle of Stoke Field with the Earl of Lincoln."

Judge Molyneux "settled at Thorpe, two miles (3 km) away, where he would have a dwelling suitable to his position, and was succeeded there by his son, grandson, and great-grandson, the latter of whom, Sir John Molyneux, sold the manor to John Halsey and others." Sir John Molyneux, (1623–1691), was once a Sheriff of Nottingham.

Population
The population of Thorpe in 1801 was 44, in 1851 115, and in 1901 66.

References

External links

 Pictures of St Laurence Church Thorpe, by Heather Faulkes
 Pictures of St Laurence Church Thorpe
 Extract concerning Thorpe from Thornville's, A Topographical Dictionary of England, 1848, pp. 341–42
 An 1884 map of the village

Villages in Nottinghamshire
Newark and Sherwood